This is a timeline documenting the events of heavy metal in the year 1990.

Newly formed bands
21 Guns
Allegiance
Amorphis
Anathema
Antestor
Ark 
ASKA
 At the Gates
Bad Moon Rising
Barathrum
Beyond Dawn
 Body Count (by rapper Ice-T)
Brutal Truth
Buzzoven
Centinex
Channel Zero 
Chokehold
Christ Agony 
Comecon  
Contraband
 Converge
Crowbar 
The Crown  
Dark Heresy
Dog Eat Dog  
Dawn  
Dead Infection
Demigod 
Demilich
Disbelief
Exhumed 
Finger Eleven 
God Dethroned
The God Machine
Green Carnation
Haemorrhage
Hate 
Impaled Nazarene
Impiety
 In Flames
Isole 
 Krisiun
Lacrimosa 
Local H
 Lost Horizon (then known as Highlander)
Lost Soul 
Man Is the Bastard
Marduk
Merauder
Mirror Of Deception
Monstrosity 
Morgion  
Morpheus Descends
 My Dying Bride
Nifelheim
Nocturnal Rites
Novembre
Osvajači
Pan.Thy.Monium
Paragon 
Penance  
Quicksand
Regurgitate
Roxy Blue   
Runemagick  
 Seance
Septicflesh
Shadow King
Skrew
Skyclad 
Sleep 
Slough Feg
Solstice 
Subway To Sally
Sugartooth
The Tea Party
Temple of the Dog
Thergothon
 Tool
Torture Squad
Tourniquet
Winter's Bane

Albums & EPs

 24-7 Spyz – Gumbo Millennium
 AC/DC – The Razors Edge
 Agony Column – Comes Alive (EP) (live)
 Alice in Chains – Facelift
 Aggressor – Indestructible (demo)
 Anacrusis – Reason
 Angkor Wat – Corpus Christi
 Annihilator – Never, Neverland
 Anthem – No Smoke Without Fire
 Anthrax – Persistence of Time
 Apocrypha – Area 54
 Artillery – By Inheritance
 Asphalt Ballet – Asphalt Ballet (album)
 Atrocity – Hallucinations
 Atrophy – Violent by Nature
 Cronos - Dancing In the Fire
 The Bang Gang – Love Sells...
 Barren Cross – Hotter Than Hell Live! (live)
 Bathory – Hammerheart
 Baton Rouge – Shake Your Soul
 Believer – Sanity Obscure
 Benediction - Subconscious Terror
 Biohazard – Biohazard
 Bitter End – Harsh Realities
 The Black Crowes – Shake Your Money Maker
 Black Sabbath – Tyr
 Blasphemy - Fallen Angel of Doom
 Blind Guardian – Tales from the Twilight World
 Blue Cheer – Highlights and Lowlives
 Adam Bomb – Pure S.E.X
 Jon Bon Jovi – Blaze of Glory
 Cancer – To the Gory End
 Cannibal Corpse – Eaten Back to Life
 Carnage – Dark Recollections
 Celtic Frost – Vanity/Nemesis
 Chastain – For Those Who Dare
 Child'ƨ Play – Rat Race
 Cinderella – Heartbreak Station
 Cold Sweat – Break Out
 Company of Wolves – Company of Wolves
 Cry Wolf – Crunch
 Damn Yankees – Damn Yankees
 Danzig – Danzig II: Lucifuge
 Deliverance – Weapons of Our Warfare
 Death – Spiritual Healing
 Death Angel – Act III
 Deicide – Deicide
 Destruction – Cracked Brain
 Bruce Dickinson – Tattooed Millionaire
 Dio – Lock Up the Wolves
 Don Dokken – Up from the Ashes
 Earthshaker – Pretty Good!
 Electric Angels – Electric Angels
 Electric Boys – Funk-O-Metal Carpet Ride
 Entombed – Left Hand Path
 Every Mothers Nightmare – Every Mothers Nightmare
 Exhorder – Slaughter in the Vatican
 Extreme – Pornograffitti
 Exodus – Impact Is Imminent
 Eyehategod – In the Name of Suffering
 Fastway  – Bad Bad Girls 
 Flotsam and Jetsam – When the Storm Comes Down
 Forbidden – Twisted into Form
 FireHouse – FireHouse
 Michael Lee Firkins – Michael Lee Firkins
 Gamma Ray – Heading for Tomorrow
 Grinder – The 1st EP (EP)
 Gwar – Scumdogs of the Universe 
 Harter Attack – Human Hell
 Heavens Edge – Heavens Edge
 Heavens Gate – Open the Gate and Watch! (EP)
 Hellion – The Black Book
 Helmet – Strap It On
 Hericane Alice – Tear the House Down
 Hexx – Watery Graves (EP)
 Holy Moses – World Chaos 
 Holy Soldier –  Holy Soldier
 House of Lords – Sahara
 Iced Earth – Iced Earth
 Impetigo - Ultimo Mondo Cannibale
 Iron Maiden – No Prayer for the Dying
 Intrinsic – Distortion of Perspective (EP)
 Janes Addiction – Ritual de lo Habitual
 Jersey Dogs – Thrash Ranch
 Jetboy – Damned Nation
 Judas Priest – Painkiller
 Killer Dwarfs - Dirty Weapons
 Killing Joke – Extremities, Dirt & Various Repressed Emotions
 Kill For Thrills – Dynamite from Nightmareland
 King Diamond – The Eye
 King's X – Faith Hope Love
 Krokus - Stampede
 Jeffrey Kollman – Schizoid
 Richie Kotzen – Fever Dream
 Kreator – Coma of Souls
 Krokus – Stampede
 Kyuss – Sons of Kyuss (EP)
 Laos – We Want It
 Legs Diamond – Town Bad Girl 
 Little Caesar – Little Caesar
 Living Colour – Time's Up
 London – Playa Del Rock
 Lostboys – Lost and Found
 Love/Hate – Blackout in the Red Room
 Lynch Mob – Wicked Sensation
 Tony MacAlpine – Eyes of the World
 Frank Marino – From the Hip
 Master – Master
 Yngwie Malmsteen – Eclipse
 Manilla Road - The Courts of Chaos
 Manitoba's Wild Kingdom – ...And You?
 Alex Masi – Vertical Invader
 Megadeth – Rust in Peace
 Meliah Rage – Solitary Solitude
 Monster Magnet – Monster Magnet (EP)
 Morbid Saint – Spectrum of Death
 Mortician - Brutally Mutilated
 Morgana Lefay – Symphony of the Damned
 Morgoth - The Eternal Fall (EP)
 Mystic-Force – Take Command - The Demo Years (compilation)
 Napalm Death – Harmony Corruption
 Neurosis – The Word as Law
 9.0 – Too Far Gone
 Nocturnus – The Key
 Non-Fiction – Non-Fiction (EP)
 John Norum – Live in Stockholm (live EP)
 Obituary – Cause of Death
 Opprobrium – Beyond the Unknown (as Incubus)
 Pantera – Cowboys from Hell
 Paradise Lost – Lost Paradise
 Poison – Flesh & Blood
 Chris Poland – Return to Metalopolis
 Praying Mantis & Paul Di'Anno, Dennis Stratton – Live at Last (live)
 Pretty Maids – Jump the Gun
 Primus – Frizzle Fry
 Prong – Beg to Differ
 Psychotic Waltz – A Social Grace
 Pungent Stench - For God Your Soul... For Me Your Flesh
 Queensrÿche – Empire
 Quicksand – Quicksand (EP)
 Quiet Riot – Winners Take All
 Quireboys – A Bit of What You Fancy
 Rage – Reflections of a Shadow
 Ratt – Detonator
 Realm – Suiciety
 Razor - Shotgun Justice
 Recon – Behind Enemy Lines
 Reverend – World Won't Miss You
 Rhino Bucket – Rhino Bucket
 Riot – The Privilege of Power
 Riverdogs – Riverdogs
 Sacred Reich – The American Way
 Sacred Warrior – Wicked Generation
 Sacrifice – Soldiers of Misfortune
 Sadus – Swallowed in Black
 Saint Vitus - V
 Salty Dog – Every Dog Has Its Day
 Sanctuary – Into the Mirror Black
 Scatterbrain – Here Comes Trouble
 Scorpions – Crazy World
 Slaughter – Stick It to Ya
 Slaughter – Stick It Live (live EP)
 Slayer – Seasons in the Abyss
 Sleeze Beez – Screwed Blued and Tattooed
 Sodom - Better Off Dead
 Sons of Angels – Sons of Angels
 Soundgarden – Screaming Life/Fopp
 Spread Eagle – Spread Eagle
 Steelheart – Steelheart
 Steve Vai – Passion and Warfare
 Stone – Colours
 Stryper – Against the Law
 Suicidal Tendencies – Lights...Camera...Revolution!
 Sweet F.A. – Stick To Your Guns
 Talisman – Talisman
 Tankard – The Meaning of Life
 Tesla – Five Man Acoustical Jam (live)
 Thunder – Backstreet Symphony
 Tiamat - Sumerian Cry
 Tigertailz – Bezerk
 Testament – Souls of Black
 Tourniquet – Stop the Bleeding
 Trixter – Trixter
 Trouble – Trouble
 U.D.O. – Faceless World
 V2 – Out to Launch
 Vader – Morbid Reich (demo)
 Vengeance Rising – Once Dead
 Vicious Rumors – Vicious Rumors
 Vio-lence – Oppressing the Masses
 Vow Wow – Mountain Top
 Warrant – Cherry Pie
 Warrior Soul – Last Decade Dead Century
 Winger – In the Heart of the Young
 Winter - Into Darkness
 WWIII – World War III
 Xentrix – For Whose Advantage?
 Xysma – Above the Mind of Morbidity
 Y&T – Ten
 Zebra – Live (live)

Disbandments
 Atrophy (reformed in 2015)

Events
Adrian Smith, Iron Maiden's lead guitarist, leaves the band to pursue a solo career. Janick Gers is hired to replace him.
Metallica wins the first ever Grammy award in the category of Best Metal Performance for the song "One."
The infamous Clash of the Titans tour is this year, headlined by bands such as Slayer, Megadeth, Anthrax, Testament, Suicidal Tendencies, and others.
August 7: Extreme release their second album Pornograffitti. The album peaked at number 10 on the Billboard 200 album chart and sold very well, due to the success of its single "More Than Words", which reached #1 on the Billboard Hot 100 chart a year later.
Judas Priest was involved in a multimillion-dollar lawsuit involving two Nevada teenager suicides allegedly caused by the song "Better by You, Better than Me". The band won the case.
Faith No More's The Real Thing, carried by the single "Epic", also cracks the Billboard Top 10.
Marty Friedman joins Megadeth replacing Jeff Young on guitar.
Possessed frontman, Jeff Becerra is paralyzed from the waist down after being shot in a mugging on his way home from work.
Lȧȧz Rockit, Death Angel, Sacred Reich and others are featured on the soundtrack of Leatherface: The Texas Chainsaw Massacre III.

1990s in heavy metal music
Metal